Dardanus is an opera by Antonio Sacchini. It takes the form of a tragédie lyrique in four acts (later revised to a three-act version). It was first performed at Versailles on 18 September 1784, and subsequently at the Paris Opera on 30 November of the same year. The French-language libretto was adapted by Nicolas-François Guillard from that by Charles-Antoine Leclerc de La Bruère, which had already been set to music by Jean-Philippe Rameau in his earlier opera of the same name.

History 
Guillard's adaptation blends both 1739 and 1744 versions of Rameau's opera, but is based principally upon the second one. Although "the title-page of the printed score reads only 'paroles de M. Guillard', [in fact] most of the text is by La Bruère". Guillard's interventions mainly consisted in "[omitting] the Prologue, [altering] the order of events in Act 3, and skilfully [compressing] Acts 4 and 5". The librettist "justified his redoing the subject ... [by explaining] that his aim was to tighten the plot and create better motivation for the characters". The dancing divertissement was done by Pierre Gardel.

The opera was not successful at its first appearance and had no more than six performances. Both Maillard, who played Iphise, and Larrivée, who played Teucer, were regarded as inadequate, the latter having to be replaced by Moreau after the second performance; the opera as a whole was deeply involved in the growing hostility towards Queen Marie Antoinette's predilection for foreigners, Sacchini being her favourite: she herself had introduced the musician to the king in 1783, when he had been celebrated at court along with another Italian composer Piccinni, when they had both been granted substantial pensions on account of their recently staged operas, Didon and Chimène.

Sacchini and Guillard later decided to revise Dardanus, reducing it to three acts and introducing new choreography by Gaetano Vestris. The new version was given at Fontainebleau on 20 October 1785 and was later brought to the stage of the Paris Opera on 17 January 1786, enjoying a total of 25 performances in 1786/1787. "It was [later] mounted annually between 1800 and 1808, and it was sung on 28 dates in these nine years", before being definitively dropped.

Roles

Recordings
Music from Dardanus was used in the film Jefferson in Paris. Extracts from the opera appeared on the soundtrack CD, conducted by William Christie with Jean-Paul Fouchécourt singing the title role.

Two arias for Iphise ("Il me fuit ... Rien peut émouvoir" and "Cesse, cruel Amour, de régner sur mon âme") were recorded by Véronique Gens on the album Tragédiennes 2, accompanied by the orchestra Les Talens Lyriques conducted by Christophe Rousset (Virgin Classics, 2009).

References

Notes

Sources
  Original libretto: Dardanus, tragédie en trois actes ; représentée devant leurs majestés, à Trianon, le 18 septembre 1784, Paris, Ballard, 1784 (accessible for free online in Gallica, Bibliothèque Nationale de France)
  Adolphe Jullien, La Cour et l'Opéra sous Louis XVI. Marie-Antoinette et Sacchini Salieri Favart et Gluck. D'après des documents inédits conservés aux Archives de l'État et à l'Opéra, Paris, Librairie Académique (Didier),1878 (accessible for free online in OpenLibrary.org), accessed 3 February 2011
 Julian Rushton, "Dardanus (ii)", in Stanley Sadie (ed.), The New Grove Dictionary of Opera, Grove (Oxford University Press), New York, 1997, I, p. 1079, 
  Théodore Lajarte, Bibliothèque Musicale du Théatre de l'Opéra. Catalogue Historique, Chronologique, Anecdotique, Paris, Librairie des bibliophiles, 1878, Tome I, ad nomen, pp. 345-46 (accessible online at Internet Archive)
 Spire Pitou, The Paris Opéra. An Encyclopedia of Operas, Ballets, Composers, and Performers – Rococo and Romantic, 1715–1815 (article: Dardanus, pp. 142–43), Greenwood Press, Westport/London, 1985
   ItalianOpera.org , accessed 3 February 2011
 
 Dardanus (Sacchini), L'Almanacco di Gherardo Casaglia (in Italian).

Operas by Antonio Sacchini
French-language operas
Operas
Tragédies en musique
Operas based on classical mythology
1784 operas
Libretti by Nicolas-François Guillard